Rhona Cameron (born 27 September 1965) is a Scottish comedian, writer and TV presenter. She rose to prominence via the stand-up comedy circuit, and was a regular on British television in the 1990s.

Television career

In 1992, she won So You Think You're Funny.

She presented the ITV game show Russian Roulette and the BBC Two show Gaytime TV. Cameron co-wrote Rhona with her former partner Linda Gibson. Rhona was a sitcom which starred Cameron as Rhona Campbell, a lesbian Scot living alone in London, who has problems similar to those of her straight friends. Only one six-episode series was made, broadcast in July and August 2000 on BBC2.

Cameron was a participant in the first series of I'm a Celebrity...Get Me Out of Here!.

In June 2009, she appeared on Celebrity Wife Swap with her partner, Suran Dickson.

She is the narrator for the Channel 4 series Find It, Fix It, Flog It.

In January 2022, she was announced as one of several comedians on GB News' newspaper preview show Headliners.

Writing
She is the author of Nineteen Seventy-Nine: A Big Year in a Small Town, a book about growing up as a lesbian in the small fishing town of Musselburgh, East Lothian, Scotland, detailing about her teenage years and father's illness.

Her debut novel The Naked Drinking Club was published by Ebury Press in 2007.

Other performances

Rhona appeared as the first female Narrator in some performances of The Rocky Horror Show UK tour 2003. She has also appeared on Lily Savage's Blankety Blank. Since 2015, she has provided the voice of Bonnie in the video game Payday 2.

Personal life
Cameron was born in Dundee and is adopted; her birth mother (whose name Cameron keeps secret) was from North Shields and her biological father is shown as "unknown" on the adoption records. She attended Musselburgh Grammar School.

Cameron previously had relationships with comedian Sue Perkins and with writer Linda Gibson.

Activism

Cameron is a Patron of both LGBT Youth Scotland and Pride London (the UK's largest lesbian, gay, bisexual and transgender Pride event). She has stated that she supports the Scottish National Party and 'the case for Independence'.

References

External links 
 
 Rhona Cameron profile Chortle, including tour dates
 Rhona Cameron at Edinburgh Comedy Festival 

1965 births
Edinburgh Comedy Festival
I'm a Celebrity...Get Me Out of Here! (British TV series) participants
Scottish lesbian actresses
Lesbian comedians
Scottish LGBT broadcasters
Scottish LGBT comedians
Living people
People educated at Musselburgh Grammar School
People from East Lothian
People from Musselburgh
Scottish people of English descent
Scottish adoptees
Scottish stand-up comedians
Scottish women comedians
Scottish lesbian writers
Actresses from Dundee
20th-century Scottish comedians
21st-century Scottish comedians
20th-century Scottish women